Melusi Ndebele (born 17 October 1978) is a retired Zimbabwean football defender.

References

1978 births
Living people
Zimbabwean footballers
Zimbabwe international footballers
Highlanders F.C. players
Zimbabwe Saints F.C. players
CAPS United players
Association football defenders